The 2010 Northwestern Wildcats football team represented Northwestern University in the Big Ten during the 2010 NCAA Division I FBS football season. Pat Fitzgerald, in his fifth season at Northwestern, was the team's head coach. The Wildcats home games were played at Ryan Field in Evanston, Illinois. The annual rivalry game against the University of Illinois was played at Wrigley Field on November 20.

The Wildcats finished the season 7–6, 3–5 in Big Ten play and was invited to the inaugural TicketCity Bowl where they were defeated by Texas Tech 38–45.

Previous season
Last season, the Wildcats finished the season 8–5 (5–3 in Big Ten play) and lost in the Outback Bowl 35–38 in overtime against Auburn.

Schedule

Regular season

Vanderbilt

Illinois State

Rice

Central Michigan

Minnesota

Purdue

Michigan State

Indiana

Penn State

Iowa

Northwestern won a thriller by scoring two touchdowns in the fourth quarter. The Wildcats led in the first two periods, but the Hawkeyes scored twice to take the lead in the third quarter.

Illinois

The Wildcats, one week after upsetting a ranked Iowa team, fell flat in Wrigley Field, losing 48-27 to the Fighting Illini. Illinois RB Mikel LeShoure ran wild on Northwestern's defense for 330 yards on 33 carries (for an average of 10.0 yards per carry), with a pair of touchdowns. The loss snapped a two game Northwestern winning streak over Illinois and sealed a bowl berth for Illinois, regardless of the outcome of their season finale against Fresno State next week. Northwestern falls to 3-4 in Big Ten play and 7-4 overall. The Wildcats face the 10-1 Wisconsin Badgers next week in Camp Randall Stadium, where they have not won since the 2000 season.

Wisconsin

TicketCity Bowl

Texas Tech

Rankings

Roster

Depth chart

References

Northwestern
Northwestern Wildcats football seasons
Northwestern Wildcats football